
Year 99 BC was a year of the pre-Julian Roman calendar. At the time it was known as the Year of the Consulship of Antonius and Albinus (or, less frequently, year 655 Ab urbe condita) and the Second Year of Tianhan. The denomination 99 BC for this year has been used since the early medieval period, when the Anno Domini calendar era became the prevalent method in Europe for naming years.

Events 
 By place 

 Roman Republic 
 Consuls: Aulus Postumius Albinus and Marcus Antonius.

 Asia 
 Han-Xiongnu War
 The Han general Li Guangli marches west from Jiuquan with 30,000 cavalrymen to attack the Tuqi King of the Right in the Tian Shan Mountains. After an initial victory, the Han are surrounded, and they lose more than 20,000 men while breaking out of the encirclement.
 The Han generals Lu Bode and Gongsun Ao march into the Zhuoxie Mountains, but they encounter no Xiongnu forces and turn back.
 Autumn - The Han general Li Ling leads 5000 crack infantry and a cavalry force from Juyan Lake into the eastern Altay Mountains but is pursued by Qiedihou Chanyu. After a desperate fighting retreat across more than 500km of Xiongnu territory, the Han expedition runs out of arrows. Li Ling surrenders and his force disintegrates in the Tihan Mountains, about 50km from the Great Wall of China.
 Emperor Wu of Han has the 'Grand Historian' Sima Qian castrated after the latter argues in defense of Li Ling's surrender.

Births 
 Lucretius, Latin prominent philosopher and poet (d. c. 55 BC)

Deaths

References